The Old Allegheny Rows Historic District is a historic district in the California-Kirkbride neighborhood of Pittsburgh, Pennsylvania, United States.  The row houses in this area date from c. 1870 to c. 1900, and the district was listed on the National Register of Historic Places on November 1, 1984.

References

Historic districts on the National Register of Historic Places in Pennsylvania
Historic districts in Pittsburgh
National Register of Historic Places in Pittsburgh